

2016–17 Top 3 standings

Standings

References

Nation